Corymbia hamersleyana is a species of small tree or mallee that is endemic to the Pilbara region of Western Australia. It has rough, flaky bark on part or all of the trunk, smooth cream-coloured bark above, lance-shaped adult leaves, flowers buds in groups of seven or nine, creamy white flowers and urn-shaped fruit.

Description
It has thin, rough, flaky or tessellated bark that is shed in small polygonal flakes, on part or all of the trunk, smooth cream-coloured bark above. Flowering occurs between April and September and the flowers are creamy white.

Taxonomy and naming
This eucalypt was first formally described in 1987 by Denis Carr and Stella Carr and was given the name Eucalyptus hamersleyana. In 1995 Ken Hill and Lawrie Johnson changed the name to Corymbia hamersleyana. The specific epithet (hamersleyana) honours the pioneering Hamersley family, including Edward Hamersley, in whose honour Francis Thomas Gregory named the Hamersley Range.

Distribution and habitat
Corymbia hamersleyana grows in shallow and skeletal soils on rocky slopes and hillsides throughout the Pilbara and North West Cape regions of Western Australia.

See also
 List of Corymbia species

References

hamersleyana
Myrtales of Australia
Rosids of Western Australia
Plants described in 1987
Taxa named by Maisie Carr